The voiceless alveolo-palatal sibilant affricate is a type of consonantal sound, used in some spoken languages.

The equivalent X-SAMPA symbols are t_-' or t_-_j and c_+, respectively. There is also a dedicated symbol , which is not a part of the IPA.

This affricate used to have a dedicated symbol , which was one of the six dedicated symbols for affricates in the International Phonetic Alphabet. It occurs in languages such as Mandarin Chinese, Polish, Serbo-Croatian and Russian, and is the sibilant equivalent of voiceless palatal affricate.  is a superscript IPA letter

Features
Features of the voiceless alveolo-palatal affricate:

Occurrence

See also
Index of phonetics articles

Notes

References

External links
 

Affricates
Sibilant consonants
Alveolo-palatal consonants
Pulmonic consonants
Voiceless oral consonants
Central consonants